David George Larimer (born March 3, 1944) is a senior United States district judge of the United States District Court for the Western District of New York.

Education and career

Born in Rochester, New York, Larimer received a Bachelor of Arts degree from St. John Fisher College in 1966 and a Juris Doctor from Notre Dame Law School in 1969. He served as a law clerk for Judge Joseph C. McGarraghy of the United States District Court for the District of Columbia from 1969 to 1970. After this, he was an Assistant United States Attorney for the District of Columbia in Washington, D.C. from 1970 to 1973. In the following years, Larimer worked as an Assistant United States Attorney of the Western District of New York in Rochester from 1973 to 1975. He was in private practice in Rochester from 1975 to 1979. An adjunct instructor of law, Larimer taught at St. John Fisher College from 1978 to 1981. He was a chief appellant law assistant for the Supreme Court, Appellate Division Fourth Department in Rochester from 1979 to 1981. He was in private practice in Rochester from 1982 to 1987.

Federal judicial service

Larimer was United States Magistrate for the United States District Court for the Western District of New York from 1983 to 1987.

On May 5, 1987, Larimer was nominated by President Ronald Reagan to a new seat created by 98 Stat. 333, confirmed by the United States Senate on November 5, 1987, and received his commission on November 6, 1987. He served as Chief Judge from 1996 to 2002. He assumed senior status on March 3, 2009. Judge Frank Paul Geraci Jr., of New York, was nominated by President Barack Obama on Monday, May 14, 2012 to the Senate and confirmed by voice vote on Thursday, December 13, 2012, as his replacement.

References

Sources
 

1944 births
Living people
Judges of the United States District Court for the Western District of New York
United States district court judges appointed by Ronald Reagan
20th-century American judges
St. John Fisher College alumni
Notre Dame Law School alumni
United States magistrate judges
Assistant United States Attorneys
21st-century American judges